Thad Vreeland Jr. (October 20, 1924 – August 9, 2010) was an American materials scientist.  He was Professor of Materials Science at the California Institute of Technology.

Career
Vreeland's career at Caltech began with his B.S., earned in 1949 and his Ph.D. in 1952.  He served as Professor of Mechanical Engineering and then Professor of Materials Science from 1954 to 1991, and afterward Professor Emeritus.

Vreeland's work on the mechanics of plastic deformation in solids and especially on dislocation behavior during the 1950s and through 1960s and 1970s was widely cited. He collaborated with his colleagues at Caltech, including David Wood. He was active in the study of shock wave consolidation in powdered metals and developing methods for the measurement of strain in multilayer semiconductors using x-rays in the 1980s.

Partial list of accomplishments 
 Served as Corporal in the 89th Chemical Mortar Battalion in World War II
 Bachelors, Masters, and Doctoral degrees from Caltech, 1946-1952
 Wrote numerous journal articles in materials science
 Co-authored "The Analysis of Stress and Deformation" with George W. Housner.

References

External links 
  Interview with David S. Wood
 History of the 89th Chemical Mortar Battalion
 Prof. Thad Vreeland, Jr.
 The Analysis of Stress and Deformation
 Mobility of Dislocations in Aluminum
 A theory for the shock-wave consolidation of powders
 Caltech Oral Histories - Interview with David S. Wood
 X‐ray rocking curve analysis of superlattices
 X‐ray diffraction characterization of multilayer semiconductor structures
 Strain measurement in heteroepitaxial layers—Silicon on sapphire

California Institute of Technology faculty
California Institute of Technology alumni
1924 births
2010 deaths
United States Army personnel of World War II
United States Army non-commissioned officers